Monique Corriveau (September 6, 1927 – June 29, 1976) was an award-winning Canadian writer living in Quebec. She mainly published books for young people.

Her sister Suzanne Martel was also a writer. She studied with the Ursulines of Quebec, at St. Joseph's College in Toronto and at the Université Laval.

Corriveau began writing science fiction during the 1970s. Her Compagnon du soleil trilogy is considered by some to be her best work in this genre.

In 1951, she married Bernard Corriveau, a notary; the couple had ten children.

She received a number of awards for her work including:
 the Book of the Year for Children Award from the Canadian Library Association for Le Wapiti in 1966

Corriveau died of cancer in Quebec City at the age of 48.

A library named after her was established in Sainte-Foy, now part of Quebec City.

Selected works 
  (1966)
 Le Wapiti (1968)
  (1969)
  (1974)
  (1975)
  (1975)

References 

1927 births
1976 deaths
Canadian women children's writers
20th-century Canadian women writers
writers from Quebec City
Canadian children's writers in French
Université Laval alumni